Lukas und Sohn is a German television series.

See also
List of German television series

External links
 

1989 German television series debuts
1989 German television series endings
German crime television series
1980s German police procedural television series
German children's television series
German-language television shows
ZDF original programming